A sieve, fine mesh strainer, or sift, is a device for separating wanted elements from unwanted material or for controlling the particle size distribution of a sample, using a screen such as a woven mesh or net or perforated sheet material. The word sift derives from sieve.

In cooking, a sifter is used to separate and break up clumps in dry ingredients such as flour, as well as to aerate and combine them. A strainer (see Colander), meanwhile, is a form of sieve used to separate suspended solids from a liquid by filtration.

Industrial strainer
Some industrial strainers available are simplex basket strainers, duplex basket strainers, T-strainers and Y-strainers. Simple basket strainers are used to protect valuable or sensitive equipment in systems that are meant to be shut down temporarily. Some commonly used strainers are bell mouth strainers, foot valve strainers, basket strainers. Most processing industries (mainly pharmaceutical, coatings and liquid food industries) will opt for a self-cleaning strainer instead of a basket strainer or a simplex strainer due to limitations of simple filtration systems. The self-cleaning strainers or filters are more efficient and provide an automatic filtration solution.

There are several different types of sifters for industrial use that can separate fine materials to very fine and precise sizes. These types of sieves are called industrial sieve machines and can operate continuously with very high efficiencies. Some can sieve materials down to as fine as 5um without using self-cleaning or ultrasonic devices, which make for no screen blinding and more efficient separations.

Sieving
Sieving is a simple technique for separating particles of different sizes. A sieve such as used for sifting flour has very small holes. Coarse particles are separated or broken up by grinding against one another and the screen openings. Depending upon the types of particles to be separated, sieves with different types of holes are used. Sieves are also used to separate stones from sand. Sieving plays an important role in food industries where sieves (often vibrating) are used to prevent the contamination of the product by foreign bodies. The design of the industrial sieve is of primary importance here.

Triage sieving refers to grouping people according to their severity of injury.

Wooden sieves

The mesh in a wooden sieve might be made from wood or wicker.  Use of wood to avoid contamination is important when the sieve is used for sampling.  Henry Stephens, in his Book of the Farm, advised that the withes of a wooden riddle or sieve be made from fir or willow with American elm being best.  The rims would be made of fir, oak or, especially, beech.

US standard test sieve series
A sieve analysis (or gradation test) is a practice or procedure used (commonly used in civil engineering or sedimentology) to assess the particle size distribution (also called gradation) of a granular material. Sieve sizes used in combinations of four to eight sieves.

Other types
 Chinois, or conical sieve used as a strainer, also sometimes used like a food mill
 Cocktail strainer, a bar accessory
 Colander, a (typically) bowl-shaped sieve used as a strainer in cooking
 Flour sifter or bolter, used in flour production and baking 
 Graduated sieves, used to separate varying small sizes of material, often soil, rock or minerals
 Mesh strainer, or just "strainer", usually consisting of a fine metal mesh screen on a metal frame
 Laundry strainer, to drain boiling water from laundry removed from a Wash copper, usually with a wooden frame to facilitate manual handling with hot contents
 
 Riddle, used for soil
 Spider, used in Chinese cooking
 Tamis, also known as a drum sieve
 Tea strainer, specifically intended for use when making tea
 Zaru, or bamboo sieve, used in Japanese cooking
Other uses
 "Sieve" is a common term used in trash-talk referring to a goaltender in ice hockey who lets in too many goals

See also 

 Cheesecloth
 Chinois
 Filtration
 Cloth filter
 Water filter
 Gold panning
 Gyratory equipment
 Mechanical screening
 Mesh (scale)
 Molecular sieve
 Separation process
 Sieve analysis
 Soil gradation
 Zaru

References

External links 
 
 
 

Cookware and bakeware
Material-handling equipment
Solid-solid separation